Bubamara (ladybug in South Slavic languages) may refer to:
Bubamara, Band
Dara Bubamara, Serbian singer
Bubamara Association of Persons with Disabilities
 The nickname of the runaway bride, from the film Black Cat, White Cat
 A soundtrack from the film Black Cat, White Cat
 Zlatna Bubamara na Popularnosta (Golden Ladybug of Popularity), North Macedonia popular culture award
 A song on the soundtrack of the 2009 Ubisoft game Rabbids Go Home